Count-kings was a description given by the historian Bernd Schneidmüller to the rulers of the Holy Roman Empire between the end of the Great Interregnum in 1273 and the final acquisition of the royal throne by the Habsburg dynasty in 1438. They were as follows:

 Rudolph of Habsburg, king (1273–1291)
 Adolphus of Nassau, king (1292–1298)
 Albert I of Habsburg, king (1298–1308)
 Henry VII of Luxembourg, king from 1308, emperor (1312–1313)
 Louis IV the Bavarian, king from 1314, emperor (1328–1347), House of Wittelsbach
 Charles IV of Luxembourg, king from 1346 (re-elected in 1347), emperor (1355–1378)
 Wenceslaus of Luxembourg, king (1378–1400)
 Rupert of the Palatinate, king (1401–1410), House of Wittelsbach
 Jobst of Moravia, king (1410–1411), House of Luxembourg
 Sigismund of Luxembourg, king from 1410, emperor (1433–1437)

This categorisation is, however, not universally recognised by historians. In fact, during this period only Rudolph I, Adolphus of Nassau and Henry VII were imperial counts; all the other kings were dukes or (Bohemian) kings and prince-electors.

See also
Anti-king#Germany
Interregnum (HRE)

Literature 
 Bernd Schneidmüller: Die Kaiser des Mittelalters, C. H. Beck, Munich, 2006, .

!Comital kings